Hans Christian Jacobaeus (29 May 1879 – 29 October 1937) was a Swedish internist born in Skarhult. 

In 1916 he became a professor at the Karolinska Institutet in Stockholm. From 1925 until his death in 1937, he was a member of the Nobel Prize Committee.

Jacobaeus was an important figure in regards to modern laparoscopy and thoracoscopy. In 1910 he is credited with performing the first thoracoscopic diagnosis with a cystoscope, being used on a patient with tubercular intra-thoracic adhesions. In 1910, he published an article titled Über die Möglichkeit die Zystoskopie bei Untersuchung seröser Höhlungen anzuwenden (The Possibilities for Performing Cystoscopy in Examinations of Serous Cavities) in the journal Münchner Medizinischen Wochenschrift.

He also did pioneer work involving abdominal endoscopy, which he called laparoscopy. The term "laparoscopy" was introduced into clinical medicine and is used up to now although Jacobaeus initially called the procedure "cystoscopy" of the serious cavities. He understood the possibilities, as well as the limitations of the procedure, and was an advocate of endoscopic training for medical personnel. He also stressed the need for specialized instruments for optimum performance during laparoscopic examinations. Jacobaeus' initial experience with abdominal endoscopy (laparoscopy) as described in Münch Med Wochenschr in 1910, was basically limited to the patients with ascites (17 patients), he reported only about two cases without ascites. 

In 1912, Jacobaeus published in Germany an extensive work on new technique - he gave an exact description of the patients' conditions and the 97 laparoscopies performed between 1910 and 1912 in Stockholm's community hospital. 

In 1901 Dresden physician Georg Kelling (1866–1945) performed a cystoscope-aided intervention of a dog's abdomen. Kelling also claimed to have performed two successful laparoscopic examinations on humans prior to Jacobaeus, but nonetheless failed to timely publish his experiences. 

Hans Christian Jacobaeus was the father of Christian Jacobæus, a Swedish electrical engineer.

References 
 Journal of Endourology Hans Christian Jacobaeus: Inventor of Human Laparoscopy and Thoracoscopy
 Minimally Invasive Surgery, Department of Surgery History of Minimally Invasive Surgery
Jacobaeus HC. Ueber die Möglichkeit die Zystokopie bei Untersuchung seröser Höhlungen anzuwenden. Münch Med Wochenschr. 1910; 57: 2090–2092
Jacobaeus HC. Über Laparo- und Thorakoskopie. Beitr Klin Tuberk. 1912; 25: 185–354

1879 births
1937 deaths
Swedish internists
Academic staff of the Karolinska Institute
Members of the Royal Swedish Academy of Sciences